Lyrica Nasha Anderson is an American R&B singer and songwriter. She is the daughter of singer and former Ikette Lyrica Garrett. Anderson has appeared on the VH1 reality show Love & Hip Hop: Hollywood.

Career
In 2009, Anderson co-wrote the song "Pyramid" for Filipina singer Charice with R&B singer Iyaz, which was released in 2010 and peaked at number one on the US Dance Club Songs chart. Anderson has writing credits on two songs on Demi Lovato's third studio album, Unbroken (2011); "All Night Long" featuring Missy Elliott and Timbaland and "Together" featuring Jason Derulo.

In September 2012, Anderson released her debut mixtape entitled King Me. In 2013, she was released from her deal with Timbaland's record label Mosley Music Group, a division of Interscope Records. In the same year she co-wrote the song "Jealous" for Beyoncé's fifth studio album. In May 2014, she released her debut extended play, King Me 2, featuring guest appearances from Ty Dolla $ign, Kevin Gates and Wiz Khalifa. In 2014, Anderson also co-wrote the song "Pretend" for singer Tinashe. She also co-wrote the song grass ain't greener recorded by Chris Brown

In October 2015, Anderson released her debut studio album, Hello. In 2016, she became a supporting cast member of the third season on VH1's Love & Hip Hop: Hollywood. In 2017, she returned as a main cast member of the reality series.

Discography

Studio albums
 Hello (2015)
 Adia (2017)
 Bad Hair Day (2020)

EPs
King Me 2 (2014)
 Nasha Pearl (2017)
 Strength (2018)

Mixtape
King Me (2012)

Singles
"Unf*** You" by Lyrica Anderson (featuring Ty Dolla $ign) from King Me 2 (2013)
"Freakin" by Lyrica Anderson (featuring Wiz Khalifa) from King Me 2 (2014)
"Freakin Remix" by Lyrica Anderson (featuring Wiz Khalifa and Eric Bellinger) from King Me 2 (2014)
"Hashtag" by Lyrica Anderson (2015)
"Don't Take It Personal" by Lyrica Anderson (2017)
"Marriott" by Lyrica Anderson (2020)
"Act a Fool" by Lyrica Anderson (2020)

Other appearances

Songwriting credits

Filmography

Television

References

External links

Living people
African-American women singer-songwriters
American contemporary R&B singers
American women hip hop singers
Interscope Records artists
Singers from Los Angeles
Place of birth missing (living people)
Participants in American reality television series
21st-century American women singers
21st-century American singers
21st-century African-American women singers
Singer-songwriters from California
Year of birth missing (living people)